L'Union des Aéroports Français (UAF) - "The French Airports Association" in English - is a French organization created in 1938. As of March 2010, it has 134 members which operate 156 airports in metropolitan France and the French overseas departments and territories. In November 2018, Union des Aéroports Francophones (UAF) merged with Les Aéroports Francophones Associés à l'ACI (AFACI) into UAF&FA.

Member airports
UAF members operate the following airports (as of March 2010).

 Abbeville – Buigny-Saint-Maclou Aerodrome
 Agen – La Garenne Aerodrome
 Aix-en-Provence Aerodrome
 Ajaccio – Napoléon Bonaparte Airport
 Albert – Picardie Airport
 Albi – Le Séquestre Aerodrome
 Amiens – Glisy Aerodrome
 Ancenis Aerodrome
 Angers – Loire Airport
 Angoulême – Brie – Champniers Airport
 Annecy – Haute-Savoie – Mont Blanc Airport
 Argentan Aerodrome
 Arras – Roclincourt Airport
 Aubenas Aerodrome
 Auch – Lamothe Airport
 Aurillac Airport
 Autun – Bellevue Aerodrome
 Auxerre – Branches Aerodrome
 Avignon – Caumont Airport
 Avignon – Pujaut Aerodrome
 Bâle – Mulhouse Airport
 Bastia – Poretta Airport
 Beauvais-Tillé Airport
 Belle-Ile-en-Mer Aerodrome
 Bergerac Dordogne Périgord Airport
 Berre – La Fare Aerodrome
 Besançon – La Vèze Aerodrome
 Béziers Cap d'Agde Airport
 Biarritz – Anglet – Bayonne Airport
 Blois – Le Breuil Airport
 Bora Bora Airport
 Bordeaux–Mérignac Airport
 Bourges Airport
 Brest Bretagne Airport
 Caen – Carpiquet Airport
 Calais – Dunkerque Airport
 Calvi – Sainte-Catherine Airport
 Cannes – Mandelieu Airport
 Cannes Quai du Large Heliport
 Carcassonne Airport
 Castres–Mazamet Airport
 Cayenne – Rochambeau Airport
 Chalon – Champforgeuil Airport
 Chambéry – Savoie Airport
 Chartres – Champhol Aerodrome
 Château-Arnoux-Saint-Auban Airport
 Châteauroux – Centre Airport
 Chaumont – Semoutiers Airport
 Chavenay – Villepreux Aerodrome
 Chelles – Le Pin Aerodrome
 Cherbourg – Maupertus Airport
 Cholet – Le Pontreau Aerodrome
 Clermont-Ferrand Auvergne Airport
 Cognac – Châteaubernard Airport
 Colmar – Houssen Airport
 Coulommiers – Voisins Aerodrome
 Deauville – Saint-Gatien Airport
 Dieppe – Saint-Aubin Airport
 Dijon – Bourgogne Airport
 Dinard–Pleurtuit–Saint-Malo Airport
 Dole–Jura Airport
 Épinal – Mirecourt Airport
 Étampes – Mondésir Aerodrome
 Figari Sud-Corse Airport
 Flers – Saint-Paul Aerodrome
 Granville – Mont Saint-Michel Aerodrome
 Grenoble-Isère Airport
 Guadeloupe – Pôle Caraïbes Airport
 Huahine – Fare Airport
 Ile d'Yeu – Grand Phare Aerodrome
 La Baule – Pornichet – Le Pouliguen Airport
 La Môle – Saint-Tropez Airport
 La Réunion – Roland Garros Airport
 La Roche sur Yon – René Couzinet Aerodrome
 La Rochelle – Île de Ré Airport
 Lannion – Côte de Granit Airport
 Laval – Entrammes Airport
 Le Havre – Octeville Airport
 Le Mans – Arnage Aerodrome
 Le Mazet de Romanin Aerodrome
 Le Puy – Loudes Airport
 Le Touquet – Côte d'Opale Airport
 Lille Airport
 Limoges – Bellegarde Airport
 Lognes – Emerainville Aerodrome
 Lorient South Brittany Airport
 Lyon-Bron Airport
 Lyon-Saint Exupéry Airport
 Mâcon – Charnay Airport
 Marseille Provence Airport
 Martinique Aimé Césaire International Airport
 Maubeuge Aerodrome
 Meaux – Esbly Aerodrome
 Megève Altiport
 Melun Villaroche Aerodrome
 Merville – Calonne Airport
 Metz-Nancy-Lorraine Airport
 Montargis – Vimory Aerodrome
 Montbéliard – Courcelles Aerodrome
 Montluçon – Guéret Airport
 Montpellier – Méditerranée Airport
 Moorea Airport
 Morlaix – Ploujean Airport
 Mortagne Aerodrome
 Moulins – Montbeugny Airport
 Nancy-Essey Airport
 Nangis les Loges Aerodrome
 Nantes Atlantique Airport
 Nevers – Fourchambault Airport
 Nice Côte d'Azur Airport
 Nîmes-Alès-Camargue-Cévennes Airport
 Nouméa – La Tontouta Airport
 Orléans – Saint-Denis-de-l'Hôtel Airport
 Paris - Issy-les-Moulineaux Heliport
 Paris – Le Bourget Airport
 Paris-Orly Airport
 Paris-Charles de Gaulle Airport
 Paris Vatry Airport
 Pau Pyrénées Airport
 Peronne-St Quentin Airport
 Perpignan – Rivesaltes Airport
 Persan-Beaumont Airport
 Poitiers – Biard Airport
 Pontoise – Cormeilles Aerodrome
 Quiberon Aerodrome
 Quimper – Cornouaille Airport
 Raiatea Airport
 Rangiroa Airport
 Redon – Bains-sur-Oust Aerodrome
 Reims – Prunay Aerodrome
 Rennes – Saint-Jacques Airport
 Roanne – Renaison Airport
 Rochefort – Saint-Agnant Airport
 Rodez-Marcillac Airport
 Rouen – Vallée de Seine Airport
 Royan – Médis Aerodrome
 Saint-Brieuc – Armor Airport
 Saint-Cyr-l'Ecole Aerodrome
 Saint-Étienne – Bouthéon Airport
 Saint-Martin Grand Case Airport
 Saint-Nazaire – Montoir Airport
 Saint-Pierre – Pierrefonds Airport
 Saint-Yan Airport
 Saumur – Saint-Hilaire – Saint-Florent Aerodrome
 Strasbourg Airport
 Tahiti – Faa'a Airport
 Tarbes-Lourdes-Pyrénées Airport
 Toulon-Hyères Airport
 Toulouse-Blagnac Airport
 Toulouse – Lasbordes Airport
 Tours Val de Loire Airport
 Toussus-le-Noble Airport
 Troyes – Barberey Airport
 Valence-Chabeuil Airport
 Valenciennes-Denain Airport
 Vannes – Golfe du Morbihan Airport

See also

 List of airports in France
 List of airports in French Guiana
 List of airports in French Polynesia
 List of airports in Guadeloupe
 List of airports in Martinique
 List of airports in Mayotte
 List of airports in New Caledonia
 List of airports in Réunion
 List of airports in Saint Barthélemy
 List of airports in Saint Martin
 List of airports in Saint Pierre and Miquelon
 List of airports in Wallis and Futuna

References

External links
 Official website